Banksia mucronulata, commonly known as swordfish dryandra,<ref name=FloraBase>{{FloraBase|name=Banksia mucronulata|id=32207}}</ref> is a species of shrub that is endemic to Western Australia. It has spreading, hairy stems, linear, deeply pinnatifid leaves with sharply-pointed lobes, pale yellow to cream-coloured flowers in heads of between 80 and 180, and egg-shaped follicles.

DescriptionBanksia mucronulata is a shrub that typically grows to a height of  but does not form a lignotuber. There are between forty and sixty sharply-pointed lobes on each side. The flowers are pale yellow or cream-coloured and arranged in head of between 80 and 180 short side branch and surrounded by tangled, woolly hairs.

Taxonomy and naming
This species was first formally described in 1810 by Robert Brown who gave it the name Dryandra mucronulata and published the description in Transactions of the Linnean Society of London. The specific epithet (mucronulata) is a latinization of mucronulate, referring to the small point on the tip of the leaf lobes.

In 2007 Austin Mast and Kevin Thiele transferred all dryandras to the genus Banksia and renamed this species Banksia mucronulata.

Distribution and habitatBanksia mucronulata'' grows in kwongan, shrubland and wandoo woodland between Cranbrook and Cheyne Beach, including in the Stirling Range.

Conservation status
This banksia is classified as "not threatened" by the Western Australian Government Department of Parks and Wildlife.

References

 

mucronulata
Endemic flora of Western Australia
Plants described in 1810
Taxa named by Robert Brown (botanist, born 1773)